Roy Cross may refer to:

 Roy Cross (footballer) (born 1947), English footballer
 Roy Cross (artist) (born 1924), British artist